Valérie Aimard (born June 1969) is a French classical cellist.

Life 
Born in Lyon, Aimard studied with Michel Strauss and Philippe Muller at the Conservatoire de Paris. She obtained a first prize in cello and a first prize in chamber music, and followed the perfectionnement cycle.

In 1992, she met Bernard Greenhouse, a student of Pablo Casals, a founding member of the Beaux Arts Trio, who became her master.

She has won several international cello and chamber music competitions (including first prize in the Maria Canals International Music Competition in 1991). She has performed in some twenty countries in recitals, chamber music and as a soloist, and has been invited to the United States for three consecutive summers at the Marlboro Music School and Festival.

Her recordings have received several awards (Diapason d'Or, Choc du Monde de la Musique, ffff de Télérama), in particular the recording of works for cello and piano by Felix Mendelssohn in 1997. When it was published in early 1998, the Diapason magazine wrote: 

Aimard is a lecturer in Teacher Training at the 2nd cycle in the Pedagogy Department and teaches chamber music at the 1st, 2nd and 3rd cycles in the Classical and Contemporary Instrumental Disciplines Department of the Conservatoire de Paris.

She has performed with her brother, the pianist Pierre-Laurent Aimard, at the Edinburgh Festival, Aldeburgh Festival, Piano Ruhr Festival, Festival de La Roque-d'Anthéron and in prestigious venues such as the Kioi Hall in Tokyo and the Théâtre des Champs-Élysées in Paris

In addition to classical music concerts, Aimard gives mime shows alone on stage, "Bulles", where she "shares her passion for the art of pantomime".

Records 
 Zoltán Kodály's Sonata for Solo Cello, (Agon, November 1996)
 Felix Mendelssohn's complete work for cello and piano with Pierre-Laurent Aimard piano (Lyrinx 1998), reissued in 2009 
 Musique française, with Cédric Tiberghien, piano (Lyrinx 2002) 
 Budapest 1900 with Cédric Tiberghien, piano , (Lyrinx 2006)

References

External links 
 Official website
 Discography (Discogs)
 Valérie Aimard, cello Debussy's Sonata in D minor for cello and piano (YouTube)

1969 births
Living people
Musicians from Lyon
French women classical cellists
Conservatoire de Paris alumni
Academic staff of the Conservatoire de Paris
20th-century French women musicians
21st-century French women musicians
Women music educators
20th-century cellists
21st-century cellists